West Dulwich is a neighbourhood in South London on the southern boundary of Brockwell Park, which straddles the London Borough of Lambeth and the London Borough of Southwark. Croxted Road and South Croxted Road mark the boundary between Southwark to the east and Lambeth to the west. The suburb of West Dulwich dates back to the 17th century when the often flooded land known as Dulwich Common was acquired and drained by Edward Alleyn's estate.

West Dulwich has two main parades of shops, the main one being on the Park Hall road junction, where Croxted Road becomes South Croxted Road and the other on Rosendale Road.

Buildings of interest

In addition to the College, other buildings of interest are Belair House; the Grade I listed All Saints Church, West Dulwich, home of the Lambeth Orchestra, which burned down in 2000 but reopened on the same site in 2006 thanks to the sustained work of parishioners and the local community; and The Rosendale pub, which is a historic coaching house that still retains the original Royal Doulton tiles. It redeveloped into a gastropub and was awarded the title of TimeOut London Best Gastropub 2007.

Transport

Buses 
The London bus routes are 3, 37, 42, 68, 196, 201, 322, 468, school route 690 and night buses N3 and N68.

Rail 
Direct rail services are available from West Dulwich railway station to Victoria (via the Southeastern Metro Bromley South line) as well as limited service to Blackfriars at peak hours.

Nearby railway stations offer services to other destinations: London Bridge can be reached from North Dulwich by the Southern Metro via Peckham Rye line. The nearest London Underground station is Brixton on the Victoria line.

Green spaces
Belair Park is located in West Dulwich and Brockwell Park, Dulwich Park, Dulwich Wood are all within walking distance of West Dulwich.

The Rosendale Allotments, which were established in 1908, are on an  site owned by the Dulwich Estate in West Dulwich between Herne Hill and Knight's Hill.

The Old College Lawn Tennis and Croquet Club is on the east side of Gallery Road.

Knight's Hill

Confusingly, there are two areas called Knight's Hill nearby; the better known area is the residential area and electoral ward in West Norwood by the road called Knights Hill. But there is a hill to the north, in West Dulwich near Thurlow Park Road, known as Knight's Hill, in which is the Knight's Hill railway tunnel. This second Knight's Hill includes the hilly land between the western end of Thurlow Park Road (South Circular), Peabody Hill and Lovelace Road, where the adjoining Rosendale allotments in Dulwich stand today. The green area is still marked as Knight's Hill on detailed maps, but to avoid confusion is not normally named on modern street maps. Both areas have similar origins, first mentioned as belonging to Thomas Knyght in 1545, and were known as Knight's Hill Common and Knight's Hill Farm, respectively. The train line between North Dulwich railway station and Tulse Hill railway station runs through the hill. Today the Peabody Hill estate lies on the western side of Tulse Hill with the Rosendale Road allotments on the top.

Politics
West Dulwich forms part of the Dulwich and West Norwood constituency whose current member of Parliament is Helen Hayes MP of the Labour Party. At the local government level, West Dulwich is split between Dulwich Village and Dulwich Wood wards in the London Borough of Southwark and West Dulwich ward in London Borough of Lambeth. Dulwich was traditionally a Conservative area but as of the 2018 local elections, all wards comprising the West Dulwich area are represented by Labour councillors.

Schools
West Dulwich has four state primary schools (Rosendale Primary School and three others) and one secondary school, Kingsdale Foundation School. There are a number of private schools in or near the area: Dulwich College, Dulwich Prep London, Oakfield Preparatory School, and Rosemead Preparatory School.

Sport and leisure
West Dulwich has a Non-League football club Wanderers F.C. who play at Belair Park. This club is famous for winning the FA Cup five times between 1872 and 1878.

Timeline

Saxon Dulwich
967 - Edgar the Peaceful granted Dilwihs to a thane named Earl Aelfheah. Dilwihs meant 'meadow where the dill grew'.

Medieval Dulwich
1066 - King William I of England became owner of Dulwich, taking the land from King Harold II of England

Lordship Lane was the eastern boundary of Dulwich Manor with Friern Manor and Croxted Road (formerly Croks Street Lane) the western boundary with Lord Thurlow's estate.

Tudor Dulwich
1538 - Dulwich ceased to be the property of Bermondsey Abbey following the abbey's dissolution.

1544 - Dulwich was granted to goldsmith Thomas Calton for £609 by Henry VIII.

Stuart Dulwich
1605 - The estate was sold for £4,900 to Edward Alleyn by Sir Francis Calton.

1619 - Dulwich College was founded by Edward Alleyn.

1785 - Belair House was built by architect probably Henry Holland.

Georgian Dulwich
1805 (+1814) - Dulwich Common was enclosed.

1812 - Kingswood House was built by William Vizard.

Victorian Dulwich
1851 - Dulwich's population reached 1,632.

1862 - West Dulwich railway station was opened as Knights Hill Station.

1868 - The Old village green was bought for public use.

1870 -  Dulwich College moved to a new campus on College Road designed by Charles Barry Junior.

1888 - All Saints Church was built between 1888 and 1897; it was designed by G H Fellowes Prynne.

1890 - Dulwich Park was opened.

Modern Dulwich
1900 - Dulwich became part of the Metropolitan Borough of Camberwell.

1901 - Dulwich's Population reached 10,247.

1940s - World War II: The Blitz and the V1 flying bombs & V-2 rockets caused widespread damage to Dulwich.

1965 - Dulwich became part of the new London Borough of Southwark and London Borough of Lambeth.

Notable residents
 Liv Boeree
 Peter Cushing
 John Lawson Johnston also known as 'Mr Bovril'
 Ernest Shackleton
 Gerry Wells, founded the British Vintage Wireless and Television Museum to host his collection of over 1,300 vintage radio and television sets.
 P G Wodehouse attended the College

Nearest places
Dulwich Village
Gipsy Hill
Herne Hill
Sydenham Hill
Tulse Hill
West Norwood

References

External links
Hidden London

Areas of London
Districts of the London Borough of Southwark
Districts of the London Borough of Lambeth
Dulwich